Last Day (Spanish:Último día) is a 1952 Spanish crime film directed by Antonio Román.

Cast
   Elena Barrios as Blanquita Peña  
 Francisco Bernal as Carterista 1º  
 Modesto Blanch as Jugador 1º  
 Joaquín Burgos as Avisador  
 Quique Camoiras as Muchacho 1º  
 Gaspar Campos as Representante Fuentes 
 Pedro Martín Caro  
 Amando de Ossorio as Jugador 3º 
 Beni Deus as Agente Ramos  
 Enrique Diosdado as Rafael Osuna  
 Víctor Ramón Domínguez as Muchacho 2º  
 Antonio Florido as Jugador 2º  
 Mateo Guitart  as Director de orquesta  
 Manolo Gómez Bur as Agente Molina 
 Vicente Gómez Bur as Traspunte  
 José Isbert as Comisario Pérez  
 Manuel Kayser  as Doctor Montero  
 Pilar Lorengar as Carmen Beltrán  
 Carmen Lozano as Laly  
 Carlos Marco as Alberto Loma  
 Arturo Marín as Carterista 2º  
 Julio Mathias Lacarra as Polizón  
 Juan Luis Quintana as Agente al teléfono  
 Julio Riscal as Agente Gómez  
 Fernando Sancho as Profesor Lorenzo  
 José María Seoane as Manolo Campos  
 Mercedes Serrano as Enfermera  
 Lorenzo Sánchez Cano as Tenor  
 Ángel Álvarez  as Dueño de la churrería

References

Bibliography 
 Bentley, Bernard. A Companion to Spanish Cinema. Boydell & Brewer 2008.

External links 
 

1952 crime films
Spanish crime films
1952 films
1950s Spanish-language films
Films directed by Antonio Román
Cifesa films
Spanish black-and-white films
1950s Spanish films